Marcus Sayles (born October 1, 1994) is a professional gridiron football defensive back for the BC Lions of the Canadian Football League (CFL).

College career
Sayles played college football for the West Georgia Wolves from 2013 to 2016. He started in 46 games where he had 123 tackles, 12 interceptions, and 24 pass breakups. He also set the program record for most career blocked kicks with 13.

Professional career

Buffalo Bills
Sayles signed with the Buffalo Bills as an undrafted free agent on May 5, 2017. He was waived on September 2, 2017 and was signed to the Bills' practice squad the next day. He was released on September 5, 2017.

Los Angeles Rams
On November 22, 2017, Sayles was signed to the Los Angeles Rams' practice squad. He was released on December 5, 2017, but was re-signed on December 13. He signed a reserve/future contract with the Rams on January 8, 2018.

On April 12, 2018, Sayles was waived by the Rams.

Winnipeg Blue Bombers
After being let go by the Rams, Sayles signed with the Winnipeg Blue Bombers for the 2018 season. Sayles played a critical role at halfback for the Bombers defense and linked up with Winston Rose as his boundary corner in 2019, to help the Bombers win the 107th Grey Cup 33-12. Sayles was named a CFL West All-Star for his play during the 2019 season.

Minnesota Vikings
On January 3, 2020, Sayles signed a reserve/future contract with the Minnesota Vikings. He was waived on August 18, 2020. He was re-signed to their practice squad on October 27, 2020. He was released on December 1, 2020.

BC Lions
On January 9, 2021, it was announced that Sayles had signed with the BC Lions to a three-year contract. In his first year with the team, he had played in 13 games where he had 52 defensive tackles, two special teams tackles, two sacks, two interceptions, and one forced fumble.

Statistics

CFL

References

1994 births
Living people
American football cornerbacks
West Georgia Wolves football players
Buffalo Bills players
Los Angeles Rams players
Winnipeg Blue Bombers players
Minnesota Vikings players
BC Lions players
Canadian football defensive backs
People from Alpharetta, Georgia
Players of American football from Georgia (U.S. state)
Sportspeople from Fulton County, Georgia